Enslaved may refer to:

 Slavery, the socio-economic condition of being owned and worked by and for someone else
 Enslaved (band), a progressive black metal band from Haugesund, Norway
 "Enslaved", a song by Mötley Crüe on their Greatest Hits album
 Enslaved (Soulfly album), 2012
Enslaved (Steel Attack album), 2004
 Enslaved: Odyssey to the West, a 2010 video game developed by Ninja Theory
 Bottom (BDSM), people playing the 'slave' part in BDSM
 Enslaved (TV series)